The 1987 Purdue Boilermakers baseball team was a baseball team that represented Purdue University in the 1987 NCAA Division I baseball season. The Boilermakers were members of the East Division of the Big Ten Conference and played their home games at Lambert Field in West Lafayette, Indiana. They were led by 10th-year head coach Dave Alexander.

Their berth in the 1987 NCAA Division I baseball tournament was the first trip to the NCAA tournament in Purdue's history.

Previous season 
The Boilermakers finished the 1986 NCAA Division I baseball season 37–27 overall (9–7 conference) and second place in East division of the conference standings, qualifying for the 1986 Big Ten Conference baseball tournament, where they were swept out in the first round.

MLB Draft 
The following Boilermakers on the 1986 roster were selected in the 1986 Major League Baseball draft:

Roster

Schedule 

! style="" | Regular season
|- valign="top" 

|- align="center" bgcolor="#ffcccc"
| 1 || March 6 || at  || Doak Field • Raleigh, North Carolina, || 4–6 || 0–1 || 0–0
|- align="center" bgcolor="#ffcccc"
| 2 || March 7 || at NC State || Doak Field • Raleigh, North Carolina || 0–16 || 0–2 || 0–0
|- align="center" bgcolor="#ffcccc"
| 3 || March 7 || at NC State || Doak Field • Raleigh, North Carolina || 0–7 || 0–3 || 0–0
|- align="center" bgcolor="#ffcccc"
| 4 || March 8 || at NC State || Doak Field • Raleigh, North Carolina || 4–6 || 0–4 || 0–0
|- align="center" bgcolor="#ccffcc"
| 5 || March 11 || at NC State || Doak Field • Raleigh, North Carolina || 7–6 || 1–4 || 0–0
|- align="center" bgcolor="#ccffcc"
| 6 || March 12 || vs  || Doak Field • Raleigh, North Carolina || 6–1 || 2–4 || 0–0
|- align="center" bgcolor="#ccffcc"
| 7 || March 13 || at  || Nixon Field • Wilson, North Carolina, || 10–1 || 3–4 || 0–0
|- align="center" bgcolor="#ffcccc"
| 8 || March 14 || at  || Bauer Field • Rocky Mount, North Carolina, || 8–9 || 3–5 || 0–0
|- align="center" bgcolor="#ccffcc"
| 9 || March 21 || vs  || Allen Field • Morehead, Kentucky || 10–5 || 4–5 || 0–0
|- align="center" bgcolor="#ccffcc"
| 10 || March 21 || at  || Allen Field • Morehead, Kentucky || 15–3 || 5–5 || 0–0
|- align="center" bgcolor="#ffcccc"
| 11 || March 22 || at Morehead State || Allen Field • Morehead, Kentucky || 7–8 || 5–6 || 0–0
|- align="center" bgcolor="#ccffcc"
| 12 || March 22 || at Morehead State || Allen Field • Morehead, Kentucky || 12–6 || 6–6 || 0–0
|- align="center" bgcolor="#ccffcc"
| 13 || March 25 || at  || Bosse Field • Evansville, Indiana || 7–6 || 7–6 || 0–0
|- align="center" bgcolor="#ccffcc"
| 14 || March 28 || at  || Brennan Field • Romeoville, Illinois, || 4–0 || 8–6 || 0–0
|- align="center" bgcolor="#ccffcc"
| 15 || March 28 || at Lewis || Brennan Field • Romeoville, Illinois || 16–2 || 9–6 || 0–0
|-

|- align="center" bgcolor="#ccffcc"
| 16 || April 1 ||  || Lambert Field • West Lafayette, Indiana || 5–4 || 10–6 || 0–0
|- align="center"
| 17 || April 1 || Ball State || Lambert Field • West Lafayette, Indiana || 8–8 || 10–6–1 || 0–0
|- align="center" bgcolor="#ccffcc"
| 18 || April 2 ||  || Lambert Field • West Lafayette, Indiana || 12–2 || 11–6–1 || 0–0
|- align="center" bgcolor="#ccffcc"
| 19 || April 2 || Huntington || Lambert Field • West Lafayette, Indiana || 3–2 || 12–6–1 || 0–0
|- align="center" bgcolor="#ccffcc"
| 20 || April 4 ||  || Lambert Field • West Lafayette, Indiana || 12–3 || 13–6–1 || 0–0
|- align="center" bgcolor="#ccffcc"
| 21 || April 4 || Eastern Illinois || Lambert Field • West Lafayette, Indiana || 8–6 || 14–6–1 || 0–0
|- align="center" bgcolor="#ffcccc"
| 22 || April 5 || at Eastern Illinois || Monier Field • Charleston, Illinois, || 9–10 || 14–7–1 || 0–0
|- align="center" bgcolor="#ffcccc"
| 23 || April 5 || at Eastern Illinois || Monier Field • Charleston, Illinois || 5–10 || 14–8–1 || 0–0
|- align="center" bgcolor="#ccffcc"
| 24 || April 7 || at  || Unknown • Indianapolis, Indiana || 5–2 || 15–8–1 || 0–0
|- align="center" bgcolor="#ccffcc"
| 25 || April 8 ||  || Lambert Field • West Lafayette, Indiana || 12–6 || 16–8–1 || 0–0
|- align="center" bgcolor="#ccffcc"
| 26 || April 8 || St. Xavier || Lambert Field • West Lafayette, Indiana || 13–1 || 17–8–1 || 0–0
|- align="center" bgcolor="#ffcccc"
| 27 || April 11 || at  || Ray Fisher Stadium • Ann Arbor, Michigan, || 0–8 || 17–9–1 || 0–1
|- align="center" bgcolor="#ffcccc"
| 28 || April 11 || at Michigan || Ray Fisher Stadium • Ann Arbor, Michigan || 1–3 || 17–10–1 || 0–2
|- align="center" bgcolor="#ffcccc"
| 29 || April 12 || at Michigan || Ray Fisher Stadium • Ann Arbor, Michigan || 1–4 || 17–11–1 || 0–3
|- align="center" bgcolor="#ccffcc"
| 30 || April 13 || at Michigan || Ray Fisher Stadium • Ann Arbor, Michigan || 5–3 || 18–11–1 || 1–3
|- align="center" bgcolor="#ccffcc"
| 31 || April 18 ||  || Lambert Field • West Lafayette, Indiana || 5–4 || 19–11–1 || 2–3
|- align="center" bgcolor="#ccffcc"
| 32 || April 18 || Michigan State || Lambert Field • West Lafayette, Indiana || 3–2 || 20–11–1 || 3–3
|- align="center" bgcolor="#ccffcc"
| 33 || April 19 || Michigan State || Lambert Field • West Lafayette, Indiana || 3–2 || 21–11–1 || 4–3
|- align="center" bgcolor="#ccffcc"
| 34 || April 19 || Michigan State || Lambert Field • West Lafayette, Indiana || 2–1 || 22–11–1 || 5–3
|- align="center" bgcolor="#ccffcc"
| 35 || April 21 || Butler || Lambert Field • West Lafayette, Indiana || 12–2 || 23–11–1 || 5–3
|- align="center" bgcolor="#ccffcc"
| 36 || April 23 ||  || Lambert Field • West Lafayette, Indiana || 2–1 || 24–11–1 || 5–3
|- align="center" bgcolor="#ccffcc"
| 37 || April 23 || Anderson || Lambert Field • West Lafayette, Indiana || 8–5 || 25–11–1 || 5–3
|- align="center" bgcolor="#ffcccc"
| 38 || April 25 ||  || Lambert Field • West Lafayette, Indiana || 5–8 || 25–12–1 || 5–4
|- align="center" bgcolor="#ccffcc"
| 39 || April 25 || Indiana || Lambert Field • West Lafayette, Indiana || 3–1 || 26–12–1 || 6–4
|- align="center" bgcolor="#ffcccc"
| 40 || April 26 || at Indiana || Sembower Field • Bloomington, Indiana || 2–7 || 26–13–1 || 6–5
|- align="center" bgcolor="#ffcccc"
| 41 || April 26 || at Indiana || Sembower Field • Bloomington, Indiana || 6–7 || 26–14–1 || 6–6
|- align="center" bgcolor="#ccffcc"
| 42 || April 28 || at  || Frank Eck Stadium • South Bend, Indiana || 8–5 || 27–14–1 || 6–6
|- align="center" bgcolor="#ccffcc"
| 43 || April 29 || at  || Greyhound Park • Indianapolis, Indiana || 14–3 || 28–14–1 || 6–6
|- align="center" bgcolor="#ccffcc"
| 44 || April 29 || at Indianapolis || Greyhound Park • Indianapolis, Indiana || 23–2 || 29–14–1 || 6–6
|- align="center" bgcolor="#ffcccc"
| 45 || April 30 ||  || Lambert Field • West Lafayette, Indiana || 8–9 || 29–15–1 || 6–6
|-

|- align="center" bgcolor="#ccffcc"
| 46 || May 1 ||  || Lambert Field • West Lafayette, Indiana || 4–1 || 30–15–1 || 7–6
|- align="center" bgcolor="#ccffcc"
| 47 || May 1 || Ohio State || Lambert Field • West Lafayette, Indiana || 2–1 || 31–15–1 || 8–6
|- align="center" bgcolor="#ccffcc"
| 48 || May 2 || Ohio State || Lambert Field • West Lafayette, Indiana || 7–6 || 32–15–1 || 9–6
|- align="center" bgcolor="#ccffcc"
| 49 || May 2 || Ohio State || Lambert Field • West Lafayette, Indiana || 6–5 || 33–15–1 || 10–6
|- align="center" bgcolor="#ccffcc"
| 50 || May 10 || at  || Walker Field • Greencastle, Indiana || 10–0 || 34–15–1 || 10–6
|- align="center" bgcolor="#ffcccc"
| 51 || May 10 || at DePauw || Walker Field • Greencastle, Indiana || 6–7 || 34–16–1 || 10–6
|- align="center" bgcolor="#ffcccc"
| 52 || May 12 ||  || Lambert Field • West Lafayette, Indiana || 9–13 || 34–17–1 || 10–6
|- align="center" bgcolor="#ffcccc"
| 53 || May 13 ||  || Unknown • Oxford, Ohio, || 2–4 || 34–18–1 || 10–6
|- align="center" bgcolor="#ffcccc"
| 54 || May 13 || Miami (OH) || Unknown • Oxford, Ohio || 5–10 || 34–19–1 || 10–6
|-

|-
! style="" | Postseason
|- valign="top"

|- align="center" bgcolor="#ccffcc"
| 55 || May 15 || vs  || Ray Fisher Stadium • Ann Arbor, Michigan || 9–3 || 35–19–1 || 10–6
|- align="center" bgcolor="#ccffcc"
| 56 || May 16 || vs  || Ray Fisher Stadium • Ann Arbor, Michigan || 4–0 || 36–19–1 || 10–6
|- align="center" bgcolor="#ffcccc"
| 57 || May 17 || at Michigan || Ray Fisher Stadium • Ann Arbor, Michigan || 2–5 || 36–20–1 || 10–6
|- align="center" bgcolor="#ffcccc"
| 58 || May 19 || at Michigan || Ray Fisher Stadium • Ann Arbor, Michigan || 2–4 || 36–21–1 || 10–6
|-

|- align="center" bgcolor="#ffcccc"
| 59 || May 21 || vs  || Dudy Noble Field, Polk–DeMent Stadium • Starkville, Mississippi, || 3–13 || 36–22–1 || 10–6
|- align="center" bgcolor="#ffcccc"
| 60 || May 22 || vs  || Dudy Noble Field, Polk–DeMent Stadium • Starkville, Mississippi || 7–8 || 36–23–1 || 10–6
|-

References 

Purdue
Purdue Boilermakers baseball seasons
Purdue